Beach Chair is a short computer animation test clip created by animator Eben Ostby for Pixar in 1986. It depicts a chair walking across the sand, dipping its leg into the water, and then moving along. Ostby made the project with the feedback of John Lasseter to work out details of rendering software.

It was exhibited at SIGGRAPH in Dallas in 1986, along with Lasseter’s landmark computer animated short Luxo Jr. and another test project, Flags and Waves by Bill Reeves. Beach Chair can also be found as an Easter egg in Pixar Short Films Collection – Volume 1, which was released in 2007.

Plot
Beach Chair is a short about a chair on the beach watching the sea. The chair goes to the border of the sea and it touches the water. It feels the water to be too cold, so it starts turning away from the beach.

References

1986 films
Pixar short films
1986 short films
1980s American animated films
1986 computer-animated films
American animated short films
Animated films without speech
Films set on beaches